Eduardo "Dado" Dutra Villa-Lobos (born 29 June 1965) is a Belgian-born Brazilian musician, best known as the ex-guitarist of post-punk band Legião Urbana. Along with singer Renato Russo and drummer Marcelo Bonfá, he was one of the founding members of that band, who formed in Brasília in 1982. Villa-Lobos remained with the band through all of their studio albums, until the group dissolved after the 1996 death of Russo. In 2005, he released his first solo album, Jardim de Cáctus, produced by Laufer .

On 30 May 2012, attended the Tribute to Legião Urbana with Wagner Moura, where they clashed with a fan during the presentation.

He is the grandnephew of Heitor Villa-Lobos.

References

External links
Dado Villa-Lobos's official website

1965 births
Living people
Villa-Lobos, Dado
Villa-Lobos, Dado
Brazilian rock musicians
Musicians from Brussels